Becket is a play about Thomas Becket, written in French by Jean Anouilh.

Becket may also refer to:

Arts and entertainment 
 Becket (Tennyson play), an 1884 play by Alfred Tennyson
 Becket (1924 film), a silent film based on the play by Alfred Tennyson
 Becket (1964 film), based on a play by Jean Anouilh

People
 Samuel Beckett (1906–1989), Irish novelist, playwright, theatre director, and poet
 Thomas Becket (1115–1170), martyred Archbishop of Canterbury and Catholic saint
 Welton Becket (1902–1969), American architect

Other uses
 Becket, Massachusetts, United States, a town
 The Becket School, a secondary school in Nottingham, England
 Becket Fund for Religious Liberty, a non-profit organization based in Washington, D.C.
 Becket, a U-shaped fastener used to hold up a pulley

See also 
 Beckett (disambiguation)
 Becket bend, a type of knot joining another line
 Becket hitch, a type of knot connecting another object